Thimble Shoal Light is a sparkplug lighthouse in the Virginia portion of Chesapeake Bay, north of the Hampton Roads channel. The third light at this location, it is listed on the National Register of Historic Places.

History
The first light at this location was a hexagonal screw-pile lighthouse erected in 1872, replacing the last lightship stationed within the bay. It was destroyed by fire in 1880 and replaced in the same year with a new house on the same foundation. This was facilitated by the availability of a newly constructed house originally intended for the Bells Rock Light, so that the light was out of service for only fifty-five days.

The second light was plagued by collisions with passing ships: it was struck by a steamer in 1891, by a coal barge in 1898, and finally by the schooner Malcolm Baxter, Jr., which struck the lighthouse on December 27, 1909 while under tow. This last collision damaged the foundation and overturned the stove in the house, which was destroyed by fire.

A caisson light was placed next to the old site in 1914; in the meantime, a temporary light perched on the remains of the old screw-pile foundation. This light has several unusual features for such lights in the bay area, most notably the diamond-shaped panes in the lantern and the round porthole windows. Unlike its predecessors, it passed time relatively uneventfully, with automation coming in 1964. The broken, skeletal remains of the old foundation remained next to the light until their removal in the 2000s. As with most lights the original Fresnel lens has been removed, replaced by more modern beacons; in this case the lens is displayed at the Coast Guard Training Center in Yorktown, Virginia. Though worn from years of vacancy, it retains most of the canopy over the lower level gallery. In 2005 it was sold at auction to a private interest, but remains an active aid to navigation.

Notes

References

Thimble Shoal Light Station's National Register of Historic Places Nomination
Thimble Shoal Lighthouse, Virginia from LighthouseFriends.com
NOAA Navigational Chart 12254: Chesapeake Bay Cape Henry to Thimble Shoal Light

External links

Chesapeake Bay Lighthouse Project - Thimble Shoal Light

Buildings and structures in Hampton, Virginia
Houses completed in 1914
Lighthouses completed in 1914
Lighthouses on the National Register of Historic Places in Virginia
National Register of Historic Places in Hampton, Virginia